In mathematics, the Frölicher spectral sequence (often misspelled as Fröhlicher)  is a tool in the theory of complex manifolds, for expressing the potential failure of the results of cohomology theory that are valid in general only for Kähler manifolds. A spectral sequence is set up, the degeneration of which would give the results of Hodge theory and Dolbeault's theorem.

See also
 Hodge–de Rham spectral sequence

References

Complex manifolds
Spectral sequences